Bugg's Hole Fen is a  biological Site of Special Scientific Interest north-west of Thelnetham in Suffolk.

This calcareous fen in the valley of the River Little Ouse has a range of habitats. Fen grassland has flora such as grass of parnassus and bog pimpernel, there are southern marsh orchid and marsh pennywort in marsh grassland, and spring-fed tall fen has lesser water parsnip.

The site is private land with no public access.

References

Sites of Special Scientific Interest in Suffolk